The 2012–13 FA Vase was the 39th season of the FA Vase, an annual football competition for teams in the lower reaches of the English football league system.

Spennymoor Town won the competition, beating Tunbridge Wells in the final.

Semi-finals

Tunbridge Wells won 4–3 on aggregate.

Final

References

FA Vase
FA Vase
FA Vase seasons